Emma-Jean Thackray (born c. 1989) is an English bandleader, multi-instrumentalist, singer, DJ and producer. She was born and brought up in Leeds, West Yorkshire, and is now based in Catford, south-east London.

Early life 
Thackray played the cornet in local brass bands in Yorkshire. She studied jazz trumpet at the Royal Welsh College of Music and Drama under British jazz pianist and composer Keith Tippett. After her studies at the college, she took a master’s in orchestral jazz composition at Trinity Laban Conservatoire of Music and Dance under composers Issie Barratt and Errollyn Wallen.

Music career 
In 2020 Thackray started her own record label, called Movementt, as an outlet for her own music. The label's first release was her solo EP Rain Dance, followed by reissues of her 2016 EP Walrus and 2018 EP Ley Lines. In June 2021, shortly after appearing on Jools Holland's BBC Two show Later… With Jools Holland, she was signed by Warner Chappell Music.

In July 2021, Thackray released Yellow, her debut album, on her own Movementt record label. The chosen label name reflects her motto: “move the body, move the mind, move the soul". The album reached No. 1 in the UK Jazz Albums Chart, and No. 3 in the UK Independent Albums Chart.

Discography

References

External links
 Official website of Emma-Jean Thackray
 Bandcamp profile E. J. Thackray
 

1980s births
English cornetists
English jazz trumpeters
Multi-instrumentalists
Warner Music Group artists
Living people
People from the City of Leeds